Glenrothes West and Kinglassie is one of the 22 wards used to elect members of the Fife council. It elects three Councillors.

Councillors

Election Results

2022 Election
2022 Fife Council election

2017 Election
2017 Fife Council election

October 2015 By-election
A by-election was called after Peter Grant resigned his seat, having been elected MP for Glenrothes

March 2015 By-election
A by-election was called after Betty Campbell died.

2012 Election
2012 Fife Council election

2007 Election
2007 Fife Council election

References

Wards of Fife
Glenrothes